Daisuke Yako (born ) is a retired Japanese male volleyball player. He was a part of the Japan men's national volleyball team. On club level, he only played for JT Thunders.

References

External links
 profile at FIVB.org

1988 births
Living people
Japanese men's volleyball players
People from Koshigaya, Saitama
Sportspeople from Saitama Prefecture